The Best of the Grateful Dead Live is a greatest hits album by the rock band the Grateful Dead.  It contains songs that were recorded live in concert and previously released on other Grateful Dead albums.  It was released on March 23, 2018.

Production
According to producer David Lemieux, "We wanted to follow up the 2015 The Best of the Grateful Dead studio set with a live counterpart, and have focused our efforts on the band's primary live albums as well as some key tracks from archival concert releases."

Critical reception
On AllMusic, Timothy Monger said, "Created as a counterpart to their 2015 two-disc Best of the Grateful Dead studio collection, The Best of the Grateful Dead Live includes highlights culled from the band's commercially released concert albums on the Warner Bros. and Arista labels as well as a handful of live selections from their own personal archives."

In All About Jazz, Doug Collette wrote, "The Best of the Grateful Dead Live doesn't purport to be comprehensive, but it does offer the novice virtually all the necessary touch-points by which to become more intimately acquainted with the unit's entire body of work (the exception, omitted no doubt by time constraints: any example of Ron "Pigpen" McKernan's extended stage spotlights)."

Track listing

Personnel
Grateful Dead
Jerry Garcia – guitar, vocals
Bob Weir – guitar, vocals
Phil Lesh – bass, vocals
Bill Kreutzmann – drums, percussion
Mickey Hart – drums, percussion on "St. Stephen", "The Music Never Stopped", "Estimated Prophet", "Friend of the Devil", "Feel Like a Stranger", "Fire on the Mountain", "Bird Song", "Ripple", "Eyes of the World", "Touch of Grey", "Blow Away", "So Many Roads"
Ron "Pigpen" McKernan – organ, harmonica, percussion, vocals on "St. Stephen", "Bertha", "Wharf Rat", "Sugar Magnolia", "Jack Straw", "Truckin'", "Morning Dew", "Brown-Eyed Women"
Tom Constanten – keyboards on "St. Stephen"
Keith Godchaux – keyboards on "Sugar Magnolia", "Jack Straw", "Truckin'", "Morning Dew", "Brown-Eyed Women", "The Music Never Stopped", "Estimated Prophet"
Donna Jean Godchaux – vocals on "Sugar Magnolia", "Jack Straw", "Truckin'", "Morning Dew", "Brown-Eyed Women", "The Music Never Stopped", "Estimated Prophet"
Brent Mydland – keyboards, vocals on "Friend of the Devil", "Feel Like a Stranger", "Fire on the Mountain", "Bird Song", "Ripple", "Eyes of the World", "Touch of Grey", "Blow Away"
Vince Welnick – keyboards, vocals on "So Many Roads"
Additional musicians
Merl Saunders – organ on "Bertha", "Wharf Rat"
Branford Marsalis – saxophone on "Eyes of the World"

Charts

References

2018 greatest hits albums
2018 live albums
Grateful Dead compilation albums
Grateful Dead live albums
Rhino Entertainment compilation albums
Rhino Entertainment live albums